Siyabonga 'Scarra' Ntubeni (born 18 February 1991) is a South African rugby union footballer who plays as hooker for the  in Super Rugby and  in the Currie Cup and in the Rugby Challenge.

Career

Ntubeni debuted for both Western Province and the Stormers in 2011, however it wasn't until the 2012 Currie Cup that he really established himself as a first team member. He featured in all of Province's 12 games during that campaign and was instrumental as his side lifted the Currie Cup for the 33rd time.

2013 got off to a slow start as injury ruled him out of the first half of the Stormers season, but he did return for the final 8 games and this coincided with an upturn in his sides fortunes following a lacklustre first half of the season.   He again made a big impact in the 2013 Currie Cup, taking advantage of Tiaan Liebenberg's injury and skipper Deon Fourie's switch to the flank to again be an ever present member of the side.  He started 11 games and made 1 substitute appearance as Province reached the Currie Cup Final for the second year in succession, this time going down 33–19 to the Sharks in Cape Town.

International rugby

On 28 May 2016, Ntubeni was included in a 31-man  squad for their three-test match series against a touring  team. After training with the national team for a few days, he joined the South Africa 'A' squad for their two-match series against a touring England Saxons team. He was named in the starting line-up for their first match in Bloemfontein, but ended on the losing side as the visitors ran out 32–24 winners.

Super Rugby statistics

References

1991 births
Living people
Rugby union hookers
Rugby union players from East London, Eastern Cape
South Africa international rugby union players
South African rugby union players
Stormers players
Western Province (rugby union) players
Xhosa people